Boccia at the 2024 Summer Paralympics in Paris, France will take place in Paris Expo. There will be expected 124 qualification slots (48 female and 48 male, 28 gender free) across eleven events. It will be first time that individual events will be in two separate categories for men and women: in previous Games, men and women took part together in mixed individual events. Only team and pairs events will be mixed where one man and one woman will take part.

Qualification

48 male and 48 female and 28 gender-free quotas are allocated via championships and world rankings.

Medalists

Individual events

Mixed events

References

Boccia at the Summer Paralympics
2024 Summer Paralympics events